Pelidnoptera is a genus of flies belonging to the family Phaeomyiidae.

The species of this genus are found in Europe.

Species:
 Pelidnoptera fuscipennis (Meigen, 1830) 
 Pelidnoptera leptiformis (Schiner, 1862) 
 Pelidnoptera nigripennis (Fabricius, 1794)

References

Sciomyzidae
Sciomyzoidea genera
Taxa named by Camillo Rondani